Nong Khaem is one of the 50 districts (khet) of Bangkok, Thailand. The district is bounded by other Bangkok districts (from north clockwise): Thawi Watthana, Bang Khae, Bang Bon of Bangkok, Krathum Baen of Samut Sakhon province, Sam Phran and Phutthamonthon of Nakhon Pathom province. Nong Khaem is Bangkok's westernmost district.

History
Since the past, the canal Khlong Phasi Charoen is an important thoroughfare of Nong Khaem. The canal was built in 1871 during the reign of King Rama IV. That is why many local  important places such as temples, communities, markets and police station located along the canal.

On July 15, 1904, it was low tide while the royal barge went through Nong Khaem via Khlong Phasi Charoen. The King Rama V forward's boat reached Krathum Baen, but the King's boat could not go further. The King did stay in front of Wat Nong Khaem temple, which is a local spiritual anchor.

In the past, area of Nong Khaem and surrounding places were all rice fields and plantations. During the flood season, locals used rowing boats for up to the waterfront market of Wat Nong Khaem. At 04.00 a.m. boats were packed up in the Khlong Phasi Charoen selling goods.

The name of the district comes from nong which means 'wetland' and khaem which means 'reed' (Phragmites karka), a reedy plant, reflecting its environment in the past. It was set up as Amphoe Nong Khaem in 1902. In 1938 it became a king amphoe of Phasi Charoen for about 20 years before it was elevated to district status again. It became a khet in 1972 after Bangkok administrative reform. In 1998, the eastern part of Nong Khaem (Lak Song Sub-district) was made part of the newly established district of Khet Bang Khae.

Nong Khaem is known for its abundant plantings of canna in the centre median strip of Phet Kasem Road. The flowers stretch along nearly five kilometres of roadway. They were planted in 1977 and have since become a district landmark.

The old building of Nong Khaem Police Station more than 100 years old, located on the Khlong Phasi Charoen. Now it has been renovated into a museum and a learning centre for local culture.

Administration
The district is divided into two sub-districts (khwaeng).

Economy
Nowadays, even many industries and prosperity are coming to encompass the area. But Nong Khaem is still one of Bangkok's 50 districts that still have a lot of green space. In certain areas there are still only few landlords, some of them own about 180 rais (71 acres). Small farmers rent 10–20 rais (3–6 acers) each for their farming. Nong Khaem used to be an area of white champaca growing up to 1,000 rais (395 acres). 

In 1973 Thai President Foods started production of MAMA brand instant noodles in a factory in Nong Khang Phlu. In 1986 the factory was moved to a larger site in Si Racha.

Nong Khaem is the original location of Channel 3, before moving to the current Khlong Toei district in 1999.

Nong Khaem is one of Bangkok's three main solid waste disposal centres. It handles 3,500 tonnes of waste a day from all 16 districts on the Thonburi side of the Chao Phraya River. Two other Bangkok Metropolitan Administration (BMA) disposal centres are on the east side of the river, in Prawet and Sai Mai districts. The Nong Khaem centre has an annual operating budget of two billion baht.

The only spotted deer farm in Bangkok has been in Nong Khaem until now.

Transportation
Phet Kasem is the main road of the district, Ma Chareon Road (Soi Phet Kasem 81) and  Soi Phet Kasem 69 (Khlong Khwang) are the shortcuts to Bang Bon and connect with other roads. This district still has no BTS or MRT access. The nearest MRT station is Lak Song located in Bang Khae beside The Mall Bang Khae.

Places
Southeast Asia University (SAU)
Thonburi University
Muban Kru Technological College
Wat Nong Khaem
Wat Wong La Pha Ram
Wat Udomrangsi
Vichaivej International Nongkhaem Hospital
Yot Khaem Park

References

External links
 BMA website with the tourist landmarks of Nong Khaem
 Nong Khaem district office (Thai only)

Districts of Bangkok